Pseudathyma is an Afrotropical genus of brush-footed butterflies called false sergeants.

Species
Pseudathyma callina  (Grose-Smith, 1898) – calline false sergeant
Pseudathyma cyrili  Chovet, 2002
Pseudathyma endjami  Libert, 2002
Pseudathyma falcata  Jackson, 1969 – falcate false sergeant
Pseudathyma jacksoni  Carcasson, 1965
Pseudathyma legeri  Larsen & Boorman, 1995 – St Leger's false sergeant
Pseudathyma lucretioides  Carpenter & Jackson, 1950
Pseudathyma martini  Collins, 2002 – Martin's false sergeant
Pseudathyma michelae  Libert, 2002
Pseudathyma neptidina  Karsch, 1894 – streaked false sergeant
Pseudathyma nzoia  van Someren, 1939 – streaked false sergeant
Pseudathyma plutonica  Butler, 1902
Pseudathyma sibyllina  (Staudinger, 1890) – Sibylline false sergeant
Pseudathyma uluguru  Kielland, 1985

References

Seitz, A. Die Gross-Schmetterlinge der Erde 13: Die Afrikanischen Tagfalter. Plate XIII 49 e sibyllina

 
Limenitidinae
Nymphalidae genera
Taxa named by Otto Staudinger